Bari is both a surname and a given name. Notable people with the name include:

Surname:
 Alexander Bari, Russian and American engineer and entrepreneur
 Judi Bari, American environmentalist, feminist, and labor leader
 Laura Bari, Argentinian-Canadian filmmaker
 Lisa Bari, American health policy strategist and consultant
 Lynn Bari, American movie actress
 Maio of Bari, admiral of Sicily
 Melus of Bari, Lombard nobleman from the Apulian town of Bari
 Muhammad Abdul Bari, Secretary General of the Muslim Council of Britain
 Nazmi Bari (1929–2008), Turkish tennis player
 Nicola Di Bari, Italian singer
 Nina Bari, Russian mathematician
 Ruth Aaronson Bari, American mathematician
 Wasim Bari, Pakistani cricketer

Given name:
 Bari Goddard, Welsh artist, photographer and musician
 Bari Imam, Shah Abdul Latif Kazmi Great Muslim Sufi Saint
 Bari Morgan, Welsh footballer
 Bari Weiss, American non-fiction writer and editor

See also 
 Abdul Bari, an Arabic name